Poland competed at the 2022 European Championships in Munich from August 11 to August 22, 2022.

Medallists

Competitors
The following is the list of number of competitors in the Championships:

Athletics

Beach Volleyball

Norway has qualified 2 male pairs.

Cycling

Road

Men

Gymnastics

Poland has entered two male and three female athletes.

Men

Qualification

Women

Qualification

Triathlon

Mixed

References

2022
Nations at the 2022 European Championships
European Championships